Protap Football Club  is an amateur football club based in Kuala Lumpur, Malaysia. They currently play in the third-tier division in Malaysian football, the Malaysia M3 League. The club homeground has been the 1,000-seaters, the UM Arena.

History
Protap Football Club is a club founded in 2017 in Klang Valley, Kuala Lumpur and participated in several competitions in Klang Valley.

Protap had their first major success in the 2017 season, when they won the Klang Valley League Division 1.

On 17 February 2019, the club competed in the Malaysia FA Cup for the first time in the club's history.

Players

First-team squad

Management team

Club personnel
 Manager: 
 Assistant Manager: Mohammed Hafeez Ahmad Mahmud
 Head coach: Mohd Faizal Md Sood
 Assistant coach : 
 Goalkeeping coach: 
 Fitness coach: 
 Physio : Muhammad Afif Ishak

Season by season record
Updated on 8 June 2020.

Notes:   2020 Season cancelled due to the 2020 Coronavirus Pandemic, no promotion or league title was awarded although this is now subject to a possible legal challenge

 Honours 

 Domestic competitions 
 League 
 Klang Valley League Div 1  Winners (1) : 2017

 Shah Alam League  Winners (1)' : 2018

References

External links
 Official Facebook Page
 Official Twitter Page

Malaysia M3 League
Football clubs in Malaysia